Ambilobe is a district of Diana in Madagascar. Its capitol is the city of Ambilobe.

Communes
The district is further divided into 15 communes:

 Ambakirano
 Ambalan'anjavy
 Ambarakaraka
 Ambilobe
 Ambodibonara
 Ampondralava
 Anaborano Ifasy
 Anjiabe Ambony
 Antsaravibe
 Antsohimbondrona
 Beramanja
 Betsihaka
 Manambato
 Mantaly
 Tanambao Marivorahona

References 

Districts of Diana Region